Godavari is a 2006 Indian Telugu-language romantic comedy drama film written and directed by Sekhar Kammula and produced by G. V. G. Raju. Sumanth and Kamalinee Mukherjee played the lead roles. The film was a commercial success at the box office in addition to receiving critical acclaim. It won several Nandi and Filmfare awards. The music of the film was composed by K. M. Radha Krishnan. There is a similarity in the names of the protagonists and the cruise boat on the river Godavari . This film was later dubbed In Hindi as Jheel Se Gehra Pyar. The film was an above average grosser in India but was successful in the US.

Plot 
Godavari is a film about Sreeram, Seetha, and the river cruise, from Rajahmundry to Bhadrachalam, that brings them together. It is a love story set against the scenic backdrop of the Godavari river aboard a cruise boat also called "Godavari".

Sreeram, aka Ram (Sumanth), is an MS graduate in engineering from the United States. He returns to India wanting to serve its people by entering  politics. He is in love with his cousin Raaji (Neetu Chandra) and hopes to marry her. Raaji's father however trivialises Ram's idealistic nature and his modest financial status and does not want Raaji to marry him.

Seetha (Kamalinee Mukherjee) is a fashion designer who runs an unsuccessful clothing boutique store. Her parents, who are not very keen about her business, want her to get married instead. Seetha, being an independent and career oriented woman, is not enthusiastic about their idea. However, circumstances force her to reluctantly agree with her parents. However, the marriage doesn't work out as the groom's family feels that she is 'too progressive and fast'. Frustrated and angry, Seetha decides to take a break from everything to go on the Godavari river cruise.

Meanwhile, Raaji gets a marriage proposal from Ravi (Kamal Kamaraju), a self-centred IPS officer, whom her father approves of. Raaji tells Ram that she's unsure about her feelings for him. Ram decides to prove his worth to her father and win her hand. However, he soon realises that she has agreed to marry Ravi. Disappointed and heartbroken, Ram is forced to join his family on the same Godavari river cruise to Bhadrachalam, where Raaji is to be married. It is on this boat cruise where Ram and Seetha meet.

There are also several sub plots involving other characters on the river boat: Chinna, a poor kid who sells balloons for a living, gets his balloons cut by a man wearing a red shirt, and jumps onto the river cruise in order to get his money for the lost balloons. At the same time, Kotigadu, a dog who is constantly harassed by other dogs, decides to leave Rajamundry to Bhadrachalam, in hopes of finding a better place for him there. Kotigadu considers Chinna as his master for saving him and later Chinna befriends Ram and tell his woes.

Ram and Seeta meet each for the first time as she hesitantly walks on the ramp that leads to the boat. Noticing her difficulty, Ram picks her up suddenly, and carries her in his arms onto the boat. Ram feels he did her a favour, but Seeta angrily demands an apology from him for touching her without her permission. The easygoing Ram apologises and moves on. Ram and Seeta after a series of misunderstandings, formally introduce each other and become friends.

Seeta starts writing in a diary to record her memories of her trip, those especially with Ram. She tries her best to woo Ram romantically many times. During a halt in their journey, the boat captain organizes a treasure-hunt and they both team up. All through the event, Seeta tries to find out if  Ram has feelings for her, but she doesn't succeed. When they are just a step away from winning the treasure hunt, Seeta asks Ram to let Chinna (a boy who gets on the boat and his dog Kotigadu) win since the latter is in financial need. Ram willingly agrees further winning her admiration. After the treasure hunt, Chinna finds out that the redshirted man, whom he followed on the boat as he destroyed his business is none other than Ravi, Raaji's fiancé. He tries to teach Ravi a lesson but eventually moves on from the issue, because he feels that following Ravi had led him to the cruise, which eventually led him to win the treasure hunt prize of Rs.50000.

Meanwhile, Raaji and Ravi, who are on the same team together, get lost during the treasure hunt as Raaji misguides him accidentally, thereby  angering him. Raaji subsequently discovers the controlling and chauvinistic nature of Ravi, and starts having second thoughts about their impending marriage. Confused and disappointed, she suddenly asks Ram to marry her instead. Ram says he will pick her up at a specific location and time and sends the details on a piece of paper. This paper accidentally lands in the hands of Seeta. Chinna, who doesn't want Seeta to read it, suddenly swallows the paper as he is aware of Seeta's feelings for Ram. Hence the paper never gets to Raaji, and her meeting plan with Ram goes awry. Raaji, disappointed and hurt with Ram, confides in Seeta about eloping plan. Hearing this, Seeta thinks that Ram still loves Raaji. Heartbroken, she leaves the boat cruise abruptly without anyone's knowledge. Subsequently, the fickle minded Raaji decides to go through with her initial marriage plan to Ravi.

Ram, confused as to why Seeta left, starts to miss her. He comes across her diary, which was accidentally left behind.  After reading it, he discovers Seeta's feelings for him. He goes to her home in Hyderabad hoping to reconcile with her. After a lot of convincing, she agrees to take a walk with him, where he suddenly proposes to her. Seeta is shocked and confused and demands an explanation from Ram regarding his feelings for Raaji. Ram tells her that he never had any plan of marrying Raaji, that the piece of paper he gave was in fact blank, and that the whole plan was just a hoax. He then expresses that his feelings all along were only for Seeta. Hearing this, Seeta is happy once again, and agrees to marry Ram.

Cast 
 Sumanth as Sreeram "Ram"
 Kamalinee Mukherjee as Seetha Mahalakshmi "Seetha" (Voice by Sunitha)
 Neetu Chandra as Rajeswari "Raji"
 C. V. L. Narasimha Rao as Seetha's father
 Lalitha Sindhuri as Madhu, Seetha's sister
 Madhumani as Seetha's mother
 Kamal Kamaraju as IPS officer Ravindra "Ravi"
 Tanikella Bharani as Captain Chintamani
 Shiva as Chinna
 Karate Kalyani as Pullamma
 Shekhar Kammula provided voice for Kotigadu, the stray dog

Production 
Kammula said the film carries a similar essence and feel of Andala Ramudu (1973) directed by Bapu. Speaking to Idlebrain, Sekhar Kammula told that "I wanted an overwhelming backdrop for this film. I watched Andala Ramudu on TV when I was in the 10th class. It left an everlasting impact on me. It made me want to go to Rajahmundry to feel the Godavari River".

About 70% of the film was shot on the Godavari River in Andhra Pradesh.

Music
The soundtrack and score of the film was composed by K. M. Radha Krishnan. The track "Andamgalena" sung by Sunitha Upadrashta won her a Nandi Award for Best Female Playback Singer. The track "Manasa Vaacha" sung by K.S.Chithra, and P. Unnikrishnan was also nominated  at the Filmfare Awards South in the Best Female Playback Singer.

Release and reception
Godavari was initially scheduled to release in December 2005 but was ultimately released on 19 May 2006 due to delay in the production.

Jeevi of Idlebrain gave a rating of 3.75 of 5 and wrote that "On a whole, Godavari film is another Sekhar Kammula’s film with good sensibilities and emotions. Godavari film is as good as Anand if not better". Radhika Rajamani of Rediff.com opined that "Godavari scores on all fronts and is worth a watch". In an article published by The Hindu, G Venkataramana Rao praised Vijay C. Kumar's work.

Accolades

References

External links

2006 films
2000s Telugu-language films
Indian romantic comedy-drama films
2006 romantic comedy-drama films
Films scored by K. M. Radha Krishnan
Films directed by Sekhar Kammula
2006 comedy films
2006 drama films
2010s Telugu-language films
Films set in Andhra Pradesh
Films shot in Andhra Pradesh
Films set in Rajahmundry